Jonas Haas (1720 – 10 April 1775) was a German-born Danish engraver.

Haas was born in Nuremberg in 1720. After spending several years working in Hamburg, he moved to Copenhagen with several other of his fellow artists. Some of these included: Johan Martin Preisler and Carl Marcus Tuscher. In 1755, Haas was appointed official engraver for the University of Copenhagen.

In addition to a large amount of small portraits of contemporary and deceased people (including 15 Zealand bishops), he produced works for The Danish Atlas and vignettes of Frederic Louis Norden's travels. In Hamburg, he had married Anna Rosine Fritsch, the daughter of an acquaintance engraver. They had four children. Three of his sons, Georg, Meno, and Peter were all engravers. Haas was buried at St. Peter's church cemetery.

References
 "Haas, Jonas" (F.J.Meier). In: Carl Frederik Bricka (ed.): Dansk biografisk Lexikon, p.438 (1st edition, 1892)
 "Haas, Jonas" (Otto Andrup). In: Ulrich Thieme, Fred. C. Willis (ed.): Allgemeines Lexikon der Bildenden Künstler von der Antike bis zur Gegenwart. Begründet von Ulrich Thieme und Felix Becker. Band 15: Gresse–Hanselmann. E. A. Seemann, Leipzig 1922, p. 390

1720s births
1775 deaths
18th-century Danish engravers
18th-century Danish printmakers
Artists from Nuremberg
German emigrants to Denmark